The epithet the Holy may refer to:

Canute IV of Denmark (c. 1042-1086), King of Denmark
Eric IX of Sweden (died 1160), King of Sweden
Olaf II of Norway (995-1030), King of Norway

Lists of people by epithet